Montcornet Castle is a castle in the commune of Montcornet in the Ardennes département of France.

History 
The castle was built between the 11th and 12th centuries by the first occupants, the Montcornets. In the 13th and 14th centuries, the fortress passed to Miles de Noyer and then to the Mello family. In 1446, Antoine I de Croy repurchased the castle and rebuilt it almost completely. In 1613, Charles of Gonzaga, who was in the process of building the nearby Charleville, capital of the Principauté d'Arches, purchases the castle. From then it passed into the hands of the Meillerais, then finally to the duke of Aiguillon, who dismantled it around 1760. Only ruins survive today.

The artefacts excavated from the castle grounds—keys, currency, pottery, bones, etc.—are on display in a room of the castle.

Château de Montcornet has been listed as a monument historique by the French Ministry of Culture since 1926.

Architecture

Gallery

See also 
 List of castles in France

References

External links 

 
 The Château de Montcornet in the « Archéologie en terre d'Ardenne » site

Castles in the Ardennes (France)
Ruined castles in Grand Est
Châteaux in Ardennes (department)
Monuments historiques of Grand Est
Gonzaga residences